John Giblin, is an active session musician, contributing mainly as an acoustic and electric bass player, and spanning genres of jazz, classical, rock, folk and avant-garde music. Best known as a studio musician, recording film scores and contemporary music, Giblin has also performed live, and recorded with Peter Gabriel, John Martyn, Annie Lennox, Phil Collins, rock/pop band Simple Minds, and has been closely associated with artists ranging from Kate Bush, David Sylvian, Jon Anderson (Yes), to jazz fusion group Brand X, and with the avant-garde recordings by Scott Walker (including the album Tilt).

Giblin has moved further into the direction of acoustic bass, and current projects include among the musicians, drummer Peter Erskine (of Weather Report), and pianist Alan Pasqua (of Tony Williams Lifetime).

Musical work and collaborations

 Brand X (Product and Do They Hurt?)
 Eric Clapton, Sting, Mark Knopfler, Phil Collins (live at Music for Montserrat)
 Peter Gabriel (Birdy, Peter Gabriel III)
 David Sylvian
 Chris de Burgh (The Lady in Red (Chris de Burgh song))
 Masami Tsuchiya (Mod' Fish, Forest People)
 Kate Bush (50 Words for Snow; Aerial; "Babooshka", Never for Ever; The Sensual World; The Red Shoes; Before the Dawn tour)
 Phil Collins songs including "In the Air Tonight" and "You Can't Hurry Love" (Face Value, Hello, I Must Be Going)
 Scott Walker (Tilt)
 Al Green
 Duncan Browne
 Joan Armatrading
 John Lennon ("Grow Old with Me")
 Judie Tzuke
 Annie Lennox (Contrabass on MTV Unplugged, including "Why")
 Roberta Flack
 Paul McCartney (live at the Royal Albert Hall, London)
 The Everly Brothers
 George Martin
 Gerry Rafferty
 Hugh Masekela (Waiting for the Rain, 1985)
 Mavis Staples
 Simple Minds (Once Upon a Time; Live in the City of Light; Street Fighting Years)
 Jon Anderson (Animation and Song of Seven)
 Manfred Mann's Earth Band
 John Martyn including (Grace and Danger & The Church with One Bell)
 Richard Ashcroft
 Franco Battiato
 Saro Cosentino (ital. wiki)
 Eros Ramazzotti
 Claudio Baglioni (Oltre)
 Manolo García
 Fish (Vigil in a Wilderness of Mirrors)
 Alan Parsons (On Air)
 Elkie Brooks (Pearls 1)
 Wendell (Dell) Richardson

References

British bass guitarists
Male bass guitarists

British session musicians
Brand X members
1952 births
Living people